Johannes Weertman (May 11, 1925 – October 13, 2018) was an American materials scientist and geophysicist.

Biography
Born in 1925 in Fairfield, Alabama, Weertman served in the United States Marine Corps for three years. He then received from Carnegie Institute of Technology his bachelor's degree in 1948 and his Ph.D. in physics in 1951 under the supervision of James Koehler. As a postdoc Weertman was a Fulbright Fellow at the École Normale Supérieure in Paris. Beginning in 1952 he was at the US Naval Research Laboratory. At Northwestern University he became in 1959 an associate professor and then a full professor; in 1963 he became there a professor of geophysics and from 1968 Walter P. Murphy Professor for Materials Science and Engineering (now professor emeritus).

He was from 1967 to 1991 a consultant for the Los Alamos National Laboratory. In 1964 he was a visiting professor at Caltech. From 1960 to 1975 he was a consultant for the US Army Cold Regions Research and Engineering Laboratory. He was also a consultant for the Bain Laboratory of the US Steel Corporation and Oak Ridge National Laboratory. In 1986 he was a visiting scientist at the Swiss reactor research institute and in 1971–1972 at Scott Polar Research Institute in Cambridge.

Weertman Island off Antarctica is named after him. Weertman was married since 1950 to Julia Randall Weertman and had a son and a daughter. He died on October 13, 2018, at the age of 93.

Awards and honors
Seligman Crystal of the International Glaciological Society, 1983
Acta Metallurgica Gold Medal, 1980
Champion H. Mathewson Gold Medal of the Metallurgical Society of AIME for work on creep and fatigue fracture, 1977
Guggenheim Fellowship, 1970
Robert E. Horton Medal, American Geophysical Union, 1962
Fulbright Fellowship, 1951
Fellow of Geological Society of America, 1970
Fellow of the American Physical Society, 1975
Fellow of the American Geophysical Union, 1982

Selected publications
 with Julia R. Weertman: Elementary dislocation theory, Macmillan 1964, Oxford University Press 1993
 Dislocation based fracture mechanics, World Scientific 1996

References

1925 births
2018 deaths
American geophysicists
Carnegie Mellon University alumni
Northwestern University faculty
Fellows of the American Physical Society
Fellows of the American Association for the Advancement of Science
People from Fairfield, Alabama
People of the Scott Polar Research Institute
Military personnel from Alabama
Fellows of the American Geophysical Union
Fellows of the Geological Society of America
Writers from Alabama
Fellows of the Minerals, Metals & Materials Society
United States Marines